The 2022–23 season is the 18th in the history of the Central Coast Mariners Football Club. This is the Central Coast Mariners' 18th season in the A-League Men. In addition to the domestic league, Central Coast also participated in the Australia Cup for the eighth time.

Players

Transfers

Transfers in

From academy squad

Transfers out

Contract extensions

Pre-season and friendlies

Competitions

Overall record

A-League Men

League table

Results summary

Results by round

Matches

Australia Cup

Statistics

Appearances and goals
Includes all competitions. Players with no appearances not included in the list.

Disciplinary record
Includes all competitions. The list is sorted by squad number when total cards are equal. Players with no cards not included in the list.

Clean sheets
Includes all competitions. The list is sorted by squad number when total clean sheets are equal. Numbers in parentheses represent games where both goalkeepers participated and both kept a clean sheet; the number in parentheses is awarded to the goalkeeper who was substituted on, whilst a full clean sheet is awarded to the goalkeeper who was on the field at the start and end of play. Goalkeepers with no clean sheets not included in the list.

See also
 2022–23 in Australian soccer
 List of Central Coast Mariners FC seasons

References

External links
 Central Coast Mariners official website

Central Coast Mariners FC seasons
2022–23 A-League Men season by team